The 2024 United States presidential election in Rhode Island is scheduled to take place on Tuesday, November 5, 2024, as part of the 2024 United States elections in which all 50 states plus the District of Columbia will participate. Rhode Island voters will choose electors to represent them in the Electoral College via a popular vote. The state of Rhode Island has four electoral votes in the Electoral College, following reapportionment due to the 2020 United States census in which the state gained a seat.

Incumbent Democratic president Joe Biden has stated that he intends to run for reelection to a second term.

Primary elections

Republican primary 

The Rhode Island Republican primary is scheduled to be held on April 23, 2024, alongside primaries in Delaware, Maryland, and Pennsylvania.

General election

Polling
Joe Biden vs. Donald Trump

Joe Biden vs. Ron DeSantis

See also 
 United States presidential elections in Rhode Island
 2024 United States presidential election
 2024 Democratic Party presidential primaries
 2024 Republican Party presidential primaries
 2024 United States elections

Notes

References 

Rhode Island
2024
Presidential